Jonathan Javier Montenegro Castillo (born May 13, 1990 in Guayaquil) is an Ecuadorian football defender currently playing for Olmedo.

External links
 
 

1990 births
Living people
Sportspeople from Guayaquil
Association football defenders
Ecuadorian footballers
Guayaquil City F.C. footballers
Barcelona S.C. footballers